At least two ships of the Argentine Navy have been named Espora:

 , a  launched in 1943 as USS Dortch and renamed on transfer to Argentina in 1961. She was scrapped in 1977.
 , an  launched in 1982

Argentine Navy ship names